The 2021–22 Segunda División RFEF season was the first for the Segunda División RFEF, the new fourth highest level in the Spanish football league system. It supplanted Tercera División, which downgraded to the fifth tier as Tercera División RFEF and succeeded the old Segunda División B, which was replaced by Primera División RFEF as the third level of the pyramid. Ninety teams will participate, divided into five groups of eighteen clubs each based on geographical proximity. In each group, the champions automatically promoted to Primera División RFEF, and the second to fifth placers will play promotion play-offs. The last five teams in each group will be relegated to the Tercera División RFEF; in addition, the four worst teams classified 13th in their group will play play-offs to define the last two relegation places.

Overview before the season
A total of 90 teams will join the league: 36 from the 2020–21 Segunda División B and 54 promoted from the 2020–21 Tercera División. The final groups were defined on 20 June 2021, with 18 teams divided in five groups.

Teams retained from 2020–21 Segunda División B

 Arenas de Getxo
 Atlético Levante
 Badalona
 Cádiz B
 Compostela
 Córdoba
 Coruxo
 Don Benito
 Ebro
 El Ejido
 Ejea
 Espanyol B
 Hércules
 Izarra
 La Nucía
 Langreo
 Laredo
 Las Palmas Atlético
 Lleida
 Marino de Luanco
 Melilla
 Mérida
 Murcia
 Mutilvera
 Navalcarnero
 Numancia
 Osasuna B
 Peña Deportiva
 Pontevedra
 Prat
 Recreativo Granada
 Salamanca
 Socuéllamos
 Tamaraceite
 Tarazona
 Villanovense

Teams promoted from 2020–21 Tercera División

 Águilas
 Alzira
 Andratx
 Antequera
 Ardoi
 Arenteiro
 Arosa
 Atlético Mancha Real
 Atlético Pulpileño
 Avilés Industrial
 Bergantiños
 Brea
 Burgos Promesas
 Cacereño
 Calvo Sotelo
 Cayón
 Ceares
 Cerdanyola del Vallès
 Ceuta
 Coria
 Cristo Atlético
 Eldense
 Europa
 Formentera
 Gernika
 Gimnástica Segoviana
 Huesca B
 Ibiza Islas Pitiusas
 Intercity
 Leganés B
 Llanera
 UD Logroñés B
 Mar Menor
 Marchamalo
 Mensajero
 Montijo
 Móstoles URJC
 Náxara
 Panadería Pulido
 Peña Sport
 Racing Rioja
 Rayo Cantabria
 Real Sociedad C
 San Fernando
 San Juan
 San Roque de Lepe
 Sestao River
 Terrassa
 Teruel
 Toledo
 Tropezón
 Unión Adarve
 Vélez
 Xerez Deportivo

Group 1

Teams and locations

Standings

Results

Group 2

Teams and locations

Standings

Results

Group 3

Teams and locations

Standings

Results

Group 4

Teams and locations

Standings

Results

Group 5

Teams and locations

Standings

Results

Ranking of 13th-place teams

Copa del Rey Qualifiers

The following clubs have qualified for the 2022–23 Copa del Rey by virtue of their league finish after reserve teams were excluded:

See also
2021–22 La Liga
2021–22 Segunda División
2021–22 Primera División RFEF
2021–22 Tercera División RFEF

References

 

 
2021-22
4
Spain